Hermel is a town in Baalbek-Hermel Governorate, Lebanon. It is the capital of Hermel District. Hermel is home to a Lebanese Red Cross First Aid Center. Hermel's inhabitants are predominantly Shia Muslims.

History
In 1519 and 1545, the town was under the administration of the nahiyah ("subdistrict") of Manasef, and tax records indicate it had 50 households, all Muslims. The town's population swelled after the  Hamade family and their associated Shia clans left Mount Lebanon to settle in Hermel and its surroundings, which were already part of the Hamade's tax-concessions since 1668.

Archaeology

Hermel plains
The Hermel plains are an area of low hills around Hermel, through which runs the Orontes river and several wadis, which drain into the Homs basin. The area dominates the north of the Beqaa Valley and reaches north to the border with Syria.  A curious and unpublished archaeological industry exists from finds of stone tools in this area.  It consists of generally small tools whose typology is limited. It was termed the Shepherd Neolithic industry by Henri Fleisch.

Hermel I (Mrah Abbas)
It is located on an uncultivated sloping plain leading down  from the Orontes. The garden revealed the remains of ten dolmens, most of which were built on a larger foundation than the covered chamber. Some were perhaps not covered by tumuli and a few were evidently not built to have cap-stones on top.

Hermel II (Jisr el Aassi)
It was found by P. Billaux and mentioned by Maurice Tallon in 1958 who made a lengthy description of the largest tumulus in 1959. The lithic industry at the site was discussed by Henri Fleisch in 1966. Some of the dolmen are inclined inwards forming a pyramid shape. There is a large tumulus north of the village that is composed of massive blocks where pottery was found and dated to the Early Bronze Age III by Tallon. Henri Fleisch found a collection of Shepherd Neolithic flints around these dolmen.

Hermel III (Choueighir)
Hermel III or Choueighir is a village on the left (western) bank of the Orontes and an archaeological site was found by P. Billaux  to the north of it. Flint material was described to be of the Shepherd Neolithic type and similar to that of Maakne and el Qaa by Henri Fleisch in 1966, it is held in the Museum of Lebanese Prehistory.

Hermel IV (Wadi el Joz)
It was found by Mohammed Hamadé, surveyed by P. Billaux and published by Maurice Tallon in 1959. A number of tumuli were discovered in this area which covered chambers on rectangular foundation platforms. They were usually orientated east to west with some remnants of walls constructed of megalithic stones. Maurice Tallon made collectins of flint and pottery from the area dating to various periods. These included an incised sherd and a tanged scraper from the very earliest Neolithic times, an Early Bronze Age flat scraper along with later Middle Bronze Age and Iron Age material.

References

Archaeological sites in Lebanon
Archaeological type sites
Beqaa Valley
Great Rift Valley
Megalithic monuments in the Middle East
Populated places in Hermel District
Shepherd Neolithic sites
Shia Muslim communities in Lebanon